Yekəxana (also, Yekakhana, Yekekhana, and Yekya-Khana) is a village and municipality in the Gobustan Rayon of Azerbaijan.  It has a population of 926.

References 

Populated places in Gobustan District